Ford Bay Water Aerodrome  is located just south of Great Bear Lake, Northwest Territories, Canada. It is open from July to August.

See also
Ford Bay Airport

References

Registered aerodromes in the Sahtu Region
Seaplane bases in the Northwest Territories